Harry Rhodes Jr. (October 20, 1922 – July 6, 2001), nicknamed "Lefty", was an American Negro league pitcher in the 1940s.

A native of McComb, Mississippi, Rhodes made his Negro leagues debut with the Chicago American Giants in 1940. After serving in the military during World War II, he returned to the Giants for the 1946 through 1950 seasons, and went on to play for the Carman Cardinals of the Mandak League in 1952 and 1953. Rhodes died in Chicago, Illinois in 2001 at age 78.

References

External links
 and Seamheads
 Harry Rhodes at Negro League Baseball Players Association

1922 births
2001 deaths
Chicago American Giants players
Baseball pitchers
Baseball players from Mississippi
People from McComb, Mississippi
African Americans in World War II
20th-century African-American sportspeople